SS Rawcliffe was a cargo steamship built for the Weatherall Steamship Company in 1906.

History

The ship was built by John Crown and Sons at Sunderland. She was ready for sailing by the end of June 1906.

The Lancashire and Yorkshire Railway bought it shortly after completion in 1906. In 1922 she transferred to the London and North Western Railway and in 1923 to the London, Midland and Scottish Railway.

She was disposed of by the London, Midland and Scottish Railway when they acquired new vessels and scrapped at Bo'ness in December 1931.

References

1906 ships
Steamships of the United Kingdom
Ships built on the River Wear
Ships of the Lancashire and Yorkshire Railway
Ships of the London and North Western Railway
Ships of the London, Midland and Scottish Railway